Deeper Christian Life Ministry also known as Deeper Life Bible Church is a Pentecostal Christian denomination with its international headquarters, Deeper Life Bible Church Lagos, in Gbagada, Lagos. It is overseen by the General Superintendent of Deeper Life Bible Church, Pastor William Folorunso Kumuyi.

History 
In 1973, while serving as a mathematics lecturer at the University of Lagos, W.F. Kumuyi started a Bible study group with 15 university students who had come to him requesting training in the Scriptures.   The church started as the Deeper Christian Life Ministry. W.F. Kumuyi was a former Anglican who joined the Apostolic Faith Church after being baptised. In 1975, he was expelled from the church for preaching without credentials. He continued his independent ministry, which in 1982 became the Deeper Life Bible Church. By the early 1980s that small group had grown to several thousand, at which time Deeper Life Bible Church was formally established. The church has spread throughout sub-Saharan Africa and then to the United Kingdom, from where branches were developed in western Europe, Russia, India, and North America.

In April 2018, The Deeper Christian Life Ministry had its new headquarters church at Gbagada commissioned with the Vice President of Nigeria Yemi Osinbajo among other dignitaries 

In 2020, the Lagos Church had 65,000 people.

Beliefs 
The denomination has a Pentecostal confession of faith. The church has 22 core beliefs.

 The Holy Bible
The Godhead
 Virgin birth of Jesus
Total depravity 
Repentance
Restitution
Justification by faith
Water Baptism
Lord's Supper
Sanctification
Holy Ghost Baptism
Redemption
Personal Evangelism
Marriage
Rapture
Resurrection of the dead
Great tribulation
Second Coming of Christ
Christ millennial reign
Great White Throne Judgement
New Heaven and the New Earth
Hell fire

See also

List of the largest evangelical churches
List of the largest evangelical church auditoriums
Worship service (evangelicalism)

Bibliography

References

External links
 Deeper Life Bible Church's website

Evangelical megachurches in Nigeria
Christian organizations established in 1973
Churches in Lagos
Pentecostal denominations established in the 20th century